Piano Concerto in F minor may refer to:
Piano Concerto No. 2 (Chopin), Op. 21
Piano Concerto No. 1 (Glazunov), Op. 92
Piano Concerto (Reger), Op. 114
Konzertstück in F minor (Weber), Op. 79, J. 282

See also 
BWV 1056, Harpsichord Concerto No. 5 in F minor, by Johann Sebastian Bach